Jack M. Ciattarelli (born December 12, 1961) is an American politician and businessman. A member of the Republican Party, he served in the New Jersey General Assembly from 2011 to 2018, representing the 16th legislative district. He was also the Republican nominee in the 2021 New Jersey gubernatorial election, which he narrowly lost to incumbent Democratic Governor Phil Murphy.

Early life
Ciattarelli was born in Somerville, on December 12, 1961, and was raised in neighboring Raritan. His paternal grandparents had immigrated to Raritan borough in the 1900s from Italy. He graduated from Seton Hall University with a B.S. degree in accounting and an MBA degree in finance.

Elected office

Ciattarelli served on the Raritan Borough Council from 1990 to 1995 and was the council president from 1991 until 1995. He was elected to the Somerset County Board of County Commissioners from 2007 to November 2011.

In 2011, Ciattarelli ran for the open General Assembly seat in the 16th legislative district, vacated by Denise Coyle, who chose not to run for re-election due to redistricting. On November 8, 2011, he and his running mate Peter J. Biondi defeated the Democratic candidates, Marie Corfield and Joe Camarota.  (Each of the forty districts in the New Jersey Legislature has one representative in the New Jersey Senate and two members in the New Jersey General Assembly.) Biondi died two days after the election. After stepping down from his freeholder position, he was sworn in on December 5, 2011. He was sworn into his full term on January 10, 2012.

Ciattarelli served on the Financial Institutions and Insurance and the Regulated Professions committees in the Assembly. He had previously served as an Assistant Republican Whip.

In the 2017 Republican Party gubernatorial primary, Ciatterelli came in second, with 31% of the vote, behind eventual nominee Kim Guadagno, who had 47%.

In 2021, Ciattarelli ran again for Governor and won the 2021 Republican Party gubernatorial primary with 49% of the vote. Although Ciattarelli pulled higher numbers than expected, he lost in the general election to incumbent Governor Phil Murphy, receiving 48.0% of the vote to Murphy's 51.2%. Ciattarelli conceded the race to Murphy on November 12, 2021. He plans to run again in 2025.

Political positions 

On The Issues, a non-partisan organization that tracks candidates' positions, and is owned by Snopes, has considered Ciattarelli to be a "moderate conservative" Republican. He supported Donald Trump for reelection as president and headlined a "Stop the Steal" rally, an event where speakers incorrectly claimed that the 2020 U.S. presidential election had been stolen from then-President Trump, although Ciattarelli claims he was unaware it was a Stop the Steal rally until after the fact. On immigration, he reversed his opposition to drivers' licenses being issued to undocumented immigrants, saying he now supports access to drivers' licenses. From his time in the legislature, he has a 75% rating from the American Conservative Union, a conservative political action committee (PAC), and a 44% rating from the American Civil Liberties Union.

Ciattarelli has said he is in favor of abortion rights prior to 20 weeks of pregnancy but supports banning abortion after 20 weeks of pregnancy (except in cases where the patient's life is in danger), and did not support overturning Roe v. Wade, the landmark Supreme Court ruling which conferred the constitutional right to abortion. Planned Parenthood Action Fund, an abortion rights organization, gives him a 20% rating, indicating how often he voted with their positions, and New Jersey Right to Life, an anti-abortion organization, gave him a 0% score, indicating how often he voted with their positions.

He did not support the legalization of same-sex marriage, but did support civil unions as being "adequate" for same-sex couples. Ciattarelli voted against same-sex marriage, but voted to ban conversion therapy for minors. He opposes New Jersey's current laws regarding curricula that include LGBT education, saying "We're not teaching sodomy in sixth grade. And we're going to roll back the LGBTQ curriculum." He was criticized for allegedly applying the term "sodomy" to refer to LGBTQ education and people, although Ciattarelli clarified he had not meant the word in regards to "someone's sexual orientation", instead he was generally referring to "mature content being taught to young children", and reinforced that "all schools should be promoting diversity, inclusivity, tolerance, and respect for others, but that doesn't mean pushing explicit subjects in elementary school classrooms". In his platform, he wants to "reform requirements for sexual and social education to make content less dogmatic and more age-appropriate for elementary and middle school-aged children." His comments were denounced by Garden State Equality, the state's largest LGBTQ advocacy group, but he has received the endorsement of Log Cabin Republicans, a PAC for Republicans who support LGBTQ rights.

Personal life
In addition to his legislative work, Ciattarelli also is the owner and publisher of Galen Publishing, L.L.C., a medical publishing company. He has formerly worked as a certified public accountant and was the co-founder of several medical journal publishing companies. He was also an adjunct professor at Seton Hall from 1998 to 2001.

He has resided in Hillsborough Township since 1998. He is married to Melinda Ciattarelli and has four children. He was diagnosed with throat cancer in 2016 and revealed that he was cancer-free in March 2017.

References

External links
Assemblyman Jack M. Ciattarelli at the New Jersey Legislature 
Official campaign website 
 

|-

|-

1961 births
Living people
21st-century American politicians
Candidates in the 2017 United States elections
Candidates in the 2021 United States elections
County commissioners in New Jersey
American people of Italian descent
Republican Party members of the New Jersey General Assembly
People from Hillsborough Township, New Jersey
People from Raritan, New Jersey
Politicians from Somerville, New Jersey
Seton Hall University alumni